David Shukuru Nshimirimana (born 2 January 1993) is a Burundian footballer who plays as a centre back for Kenyan club Sofapaka and the Burundi national team.

Club career
In March 2019, Nshimirimana joined Zambia Super League club Buildcon from Rwandan club Mukura Victory Sports.

International career
Nshimirimana made his international debut in 2014.

Nshimirimana was included in Burundi's squad for the 2019 Africa Cup of Nations, and appeared in Burundi's 1–0 defeat to Nigeria.

References

External links
 
 
 

1993 births
Living people
Burundian footballers
Sportspeople from Bujumbura
Association football defenders
Flambeau de l'Est FC players
Vital'O F.C. players
Buildcon F.C. players
Sofapaka F.C. players
Burundi international footballers
2019 Africa Cup of Nations players
Burundian expatriate footballers
Expatriate footballers in Rwanda
Burundian expatriate sportspeople in Rwanda
Expatriate footballers in Zambia
Burundian expatriate sportspeople in Zambia
Expatriate footballers in Kenya
Burundian expatriate sportspeople in Kenya